The 2019 Women's Roller Hockey World Cup will be the 15th edition of the Women's Roller Hockey World Cup, organised by World Skate. The tournament will be held in Spain, in the city of Barcelona, as part of the 2019 World Roller Games.

Competition format
Eight teams composed the World Championship (first tier) and six the Intercontinental Cup (second tier).

Teams were divided into groups of four teams for composing the group stage in the World Championship, while the Intercontinental Cup was played in a round-robin format.

World Championship

Qualified teams
On 12 March 2019, teams were announced.

Group stage

Group A

Group B

Knockout stage

Fifth to eight position

Intercontinental Cup

Group stage

Final standings

|-
| colspan="11"| Played the Intercontinental Cup
|-

|}

References

External links
World Skate website

Women's Roller Hockey World Cup
International roller hockey competitions hosted by Spain
Sport in Barcelona
FIRS World Championship
Roller Hockey World Cup, Women
Roller Hockey World Cup